Thomas David Gibson-Carmichael, 1st Baron Carmichael,  (18 March 1859 – 16 January 1926), known as Sir Thomas Gibson-Carmichael, 11th Baronet, between 1891 and 1912, was a Scottish Liberal politician and colonial administrator. He was also a keen naturalist.

Background and education
Born near Edinburgh, Scotland, Carmichael was the eldest son of Reverend Sir William Henry Gibson-Carmichael, 10th Baronet, and Eleanora Anne Anderson, daughter of David Anderson.

He was educated at the Wixenford House school of Cowley Powles, then near Eversley in Wixenford and St John's College, Cambridge. He succeeded his father as 11th Baronet in 1891.

Political career
Carmichael was Private Secretary to George Trevelyan and Lord Dalhousie, when Secretaries for Scotland. He unsuccessfully contested Peebles and Selkirk in 1892  but was successfully returned as Liberal Member of Parliament for Midlothian in 1895, succeeding William Ewart Gladstone. He continued to represent this constituency until the 1900 general election. During this period, Carmichael leased Malleny House and Garden. He developed the gardens, as well as organising decorative ironwork to be added to the garden.

Colonial Governor

Carmichael was appointed Governor of Victoria in 1908 and served from 27 July 1908 to 19 May 1911.

As governor, Carmichael permitted Victoria Premier Sir Thomas Bent who had lost a no-confidence vote on 3 December 1908 to dissolve the assembly and call for fresh elections. Thomas Bent, however, lost the elections and John Murray succeeded him as premier.  A Royal Commission investigation was started in 1909 to inquire into the financial misappropriations made by Bent.

In 1911 Carmichael was appointed governor of Madras and served from 3 November 1911 to 30 March 1912. He was elected President of The Asiatic Society for 1913–15.

Honours
He was appointed a Knight Commander of the Order of St Michael and St George in 1908, a Knight Grand Commander of the Order of the Indian Empire in 1911 and a Knight Grand Commander of the Order of the Star of India in 1917. In 1912 he was raised to the peerage as Baron Carmichael, of Skirling in the County of Peebles. Sir Ashutosh Mukherjee created a post Carmichael Professor of Ancient Indian History and Culture, after his name. Carmichael College in Rangpur, Bangladesh is named after and was inaugurated by him in 1916.

Other public appointments
Carmichael was also Chairman of the Commissioners in Lunacy for Scotland from 1894 to 1897, a Trustee of the Board of Manufactures in Scotland from 1900, a Trustee of the National Portrait Gallery from 1904 to 1908 and of the National Gallery from 1906 to 1908 and again from 1923 to 1926. Between 1920 and 1926 he served as Lord Lieutenant of Peeblesshire.

In 1891 he founded the Scottish Beekeepers Association.

Freemasonry
He was a freemason. He was initiated, passed and raised within eight days of 1895 in the Dramatic and Arts Lodge No. 757. He became Worshipful Master of the Lodge in 1902 and served for two years. He was also appointed Senior Grand Deacon of the Grand Lodge of Scotland. Seven years later he became Grand Master of the Grand Lodge of Scotland. When he was appointed Governor of Victoria, he resigned from Grand Master only to become almost immediately Grand Master of the Grand Lodge of Victoria.

Served as Provincial Grand Master of Midlothian 1904-1909.

Personal life
Lord Carmichael married the Hon. Mary Helen Elizabeth, daughter of Baron Albert Nugent, in 1886. They had no children. He died at 13 Portman Street, London, in January 1926, aged 66, and was buried at Skirling, Biggar, Lanarkshire. The barony became extinct on his death while he was succeeded in the baronetcy by his cousin, Henry Thomas Gibson-Craig. He was a keen amateur entomologist. During his career in India, he made a large collection of insects, mainly from the Darjeeling region, which he gave to the Indian Museum before leaving India. The damselfly species, Drepanosticta carmichaeli was named after him by Laidlaw in 1915.

References

Bibliography

External links
 

1859 births
1926 deaths
People educated at Wixenford School
Alumni of St John's College, Cambridge
Gibson-Carmichael, Thomas
Gibson-Carmichael, Thomas
Gibson-Carmichael, Thomas
UK MPs who were granted peerages
Knights Grand Commander of the Order of the Indian Empire
Knights Grand Commander of the Order of the Star of India
Knights Commander of the Order of St Michael and St George
Barons in the Peerage of the United Kingdom
Governors of Victoria (Australia)
British governors of Bengal
Lord-Lieutenants of Peeblesshire
Australian Freemasons
Masonic Grand Masters
Presidents of The Asiatic Society
Barons created by George V